Ulster Football Club is a defunct Irish association football club that was based in Ballynafeigh, Belfast.

History

It was initially founded in 1877 as a rugby club, but later switched codes to association football. It was subsequently a founding member of the Irish Football League in 1890. The club later switched back to rugby and continued playing into the 1930s.

The club was founded by members of Ulster Cricket Club and played its home games at the Ulster Cricket Ground. It is listed as a rugby club in Richard M. Peter’s Irish Football Annual 1880 and during the 1879-80 season it played 24 games, taking on, among others, local rivals North of Ireland and Queen's College, Belfast. On October 24, 1878 the club hosted a demonstration game between two Scottish association football teams, Queen's Park and Caledonian. This game is recognised as the earliest organised association football match played in Ireland. The club continued, however, playing rugby before switching to association football for the 1882-83 season. During the 1880s and early 1890s, both Ulster and its home ground played a prominent role in the early history of association football in Ireland. Ulster reached the Irish Cup final on three occasions, winning the competition in 1887 after defeating Cliftonville 3-0 in the final. They were also founder members of the Irish Football League and finished as runners-up during its first two seasons, 1890-91 and 1891-92. The club was a member of the League for six seasons in total: four between 1890 and 1894 and two from 1901 to 1903. In between times, the club reverted to rugby, playing in the Ulster Senior League from 1894-1901. During the 1880s, Ballynafeigh also hosted several Irish Cup finals and Ireland international games.

Colours

The club played in black and red.

Honours
Irish Cup 1:
1886–87

Notable former players

Ireland internationals
Twelve Ulster F.C. players represented Ireland at international level, winning 44 caps between them. Reynolds also went on to play for England.

See also
Ulster Cricket Club

References

 
Rugby clubs established in 1877
Association football clubs established in 1877
Defunct Irish rugby union teams
Defunct rugby union clubs in Northern Ireland
Defunct association football clubs in Northern Ireland
Defunct Irish Football League clubs
Association football clubs in Belfast
1877 establishments in Ireland
Former senior Irish Football League clubs
Rugby union clubs in County Antrim